The Vocabula Review was a monthly electronic magazine about the state of the English language.

Publication
The journal was published online by the Vocabula Communications Company. Online access was by subscription. All previous issues were accessible online. The editor-in-chief and publisher was Robert Hartwell Fiske. He was the editor of two collections of essays and poems that were previously published in The Vocabula Review: Vocabula Bound 1: Outbursts, Insights, Explanations, and Oddities and Vocabula Bound 2: Our Wresting, Writhing Tongue. Fiske also authored The Dimwit's Dictionary, a volume on over-used English words.

The magazine's guiding philosophy of the English language tended to be anti-linguist and prescriptive, promoting prose that is elegant, clear, and precise.

History
The magazine was first published in September 1999. From January 2005, articles also appeared in a print version, the Vocabula Bound Quarterly.

References

Further reading

External links 
  Archived
 

Monthly magazines published in the United States
English-language magazines
Magazines established in 1999
Online magazines published in the United States
Defunct magazines published in the United States
Magazines with year of disestablishment missing
1999 establishments in the United States